The following highways are numbered 31:

International
 Asian Highway 31
 European route E31

Australia
  Hume Highway
 Hume Motorway
 Hume Freeway
   - South Australia
 Gorge Road
 Little Para Road
 South Para Road
 Lyndoch Valley Road

Austria
  Burgenland Schnellstraße
  Ybbstal Straße

Burma
National Highway 31 (Burma)

Canada
 Alberta Highway 31
 British Columbia Highway 31
 Manitoba Highway 31
 Ontario Highway 31 (former, now Ottawa Road 31)
 Quebec Autoroute 31
 Saskatchewan Highway 31

Czech Republic
 part of  I/31 Highway; Czech: Silnice I/31

France
 A31 autoroute

Germany
 Bundesautobahn 31
 Bundesstraße 31

Iceland
 Route 31 (Iceland)

India

Iran
 Road 31

Ireland
  N31 road (Ireland)

Israel
 Highway 31 (Israel)

Italy
 Autostrada A31 (Italy)

Japan
 Japan National Route 31
 Hiroshima-Kure Road

Korea, South
 National Route 31

Netherlands
 A31 motorway (Netherlands)

New Zealand
 New Zealand State Highway 31

South Africa
 M31 road (Johannesburg)

Sri Lanka
 A31 highway (Sri Lanka)

Thailand
 Thailand Route 31 (Vibhavadi Rangsit Road)

Turkey
  , a motorway in Turkey running from İzmir to Aydın.

United Kingdom
 British A31 (Bere Regis-Guilford)
 A31 road (Isle of Man)

United States
 Interstate 31 (former proposal)
 U.S. Route 31
 U.S. Route 31W
 U.S. Route 31E
 Arkansas Highway 31
 California State Route 31
 County Route J31 (California)
 County Route S31 (California)
 Connecticut Route 31
 Florida State Road 31
 Georgia State Route 31
 Hawaii Route 31
 Idaho State Highway 31
 Illinois Route 31
 Iowa Highway 31
 K-31 (Kansas highway)
 Louisiana Highway 31
 Maryland Route 31
 Massachusetts Route 31
 M-31 (Michigan highway) (former)
 Minnesota State Highway 31
 County Road 31 (Anoka County, Minnesota)
 County Road 31 (Dakota County, Minnesota)
 County Road 31 (Hennepin County, Minnesota)
 County Road 31 (Ramsey County, Minnesota)
 Missouri Route 31
 Nebraska Highway 31
 Nevada State Route 31 (former)
 New Hampshire Route 31
 New Jersey Route 31
 County Route 31 (Bergen County, New Jersey)
 County Route S31 (Bergen County, New Jersey)
 County Route 31 (Monmouth County, New Jersey)
 County Route 31 (Ocean County, New Jersey)
 New Mexico State Road 31
 New York State Route 31
 New York State Route 31F
 County Route 31 (Dutchess County, New York)
 County Route 31 (Franklin County, New York)
 County Route 31 (Greene County, New York)
 County Route 31 (Livingston County, New York)
 County Route 31 (Montgomery County, New York)
 County Route 31 (Niagara County, New York)
 County Route 31 (Orleans County, New York)
 County Route 31 (Otsego County, New York)
 County Route 31 (Suffolk County, New York)
 County Route 31 (Ulster County, New York)
 County Route 31 (Wyoming County, New York)
 North Carolina Highway 31 (former)
 North Dakota Highway 31
 Ohio State Route 31
 Oklahoma State Highway 31
 Oregon Route 31
 Pennsylvania Route 31
 South Carolina Highway 31
 Tennessee State Route 31
 Texas State Highway 31
 Texas State Highway Spur 31
 Farm to Market Road 31
 Texas Park Road 31
 Utah State Route 31
 Vermont Route 31
 Virginia State Route 31
 Virginia State Route 31 (1923-1933) (former)
 Washington State Route 31
 West Virginia Route 31
 Wisconsin Highway 31
 Wyoming Highway 31

Territories
 Puerto Rico Highway 31

See also 
 A31 (disambiguation)#Roads
 List of highways numbered 31A
 List of highways numbered 31B
 List of highways numbered 31C
 List of highways numbered 31D
 List of highways numbered 31E